Lambeth London Borough Council is elected every four years.

Political control
The first election to the council was held in 1964, initially operating as a shadow authority before the new system came into full effect in 1965. Political control of the council since 1964 has been held by the following parties:

Leadership
The leaders of the council since 1965 have been:

Council elections
 1964 Lambeth London Borough Council election
 1968 Lambeth London Borough Council election
 1971 Lambeth London Borough Council election
 1974 Lambeth London Borough Council election
 1978 Lambeth London Borough Council election (boundary changes increased the number of seats by four)
 1982 Lambeth London Borough Council election
 1986 Lambeth London Borough Council election
 1990 Lambeth London Borough Council election
 1994 Lambeth London Borough Council election (boundary changes took place but the number of seats remained the same)
 1998 Lambeth London Borough Council election
 2002 Lambeth London Borough Council election (boundary changes reduced the number of seats by one) 
 2006 Lambeth London Borough Council election
 2010 Lambeth London Borough Council election 
 2014 Lambeth London Borough Council election
 2018 Lambeth London Borough Council election
 2022 Lambeth London Borough Council election

Borough result maps

By-election results

1964–1968
There were no by-elections.

1968–1971

1971–1974
There were no by-elections.

1974–1978

1978–1982

1982–1986

1986–1990

1990–1994

The by-election was called following the resignation of Cllr. Dick J. F. Sorabji.

The by-election was called following the resignation of Cllr. Susan T. B. Smith.

The by-election was called following the resignation of Cllr. Colin Mason.

The by-election was called following the resignation of Cllr. Ian R. Mallett.

The by-election was called following the resignation of Cllr. Kenneth J. Sharvill.

The by-election was called following the resignation of Cllr. John Tuite.

The by-election was called following the death of Cllr. Graham P. Nicholas.

The by-election was called following the resignation of Cllr. Gloria Hutchens.

The by-election was called following the resignation of Cllr. Joseph Singh.

1994–1998

The by-election was called following the resignations of Cllrs. Denis E. Cooper-King and John E. Harrison.

The by-election was called following the resignation of Cllr. Roger J. Liddle.

The by-election was called following the resignation of Cllr. Peter J. Evans.

The by-election was called following the resignation of Cllr. Joseph Callinan.

The by-election was called following the resignation of Cllr. Margaret E. Jones.

1998–2002

The by-election was called following the resignation of Cllr. Alan M. White.

The by-election was called following the resignation of Cllr. Michael D. Cruickshanks.

The by-election was called following the resignation of Cllr. Paul Connolly.

The by-election was called following the resignation of Cllr. Anthony P. Hewitt.

2002–2006

The by-election was called following the resignation of Cllr. Gabriel Fernandes.

The by-election was called following the death of Cllr. Tim Sargeant.

2006–2010

The by-election was called following the death of Cllr. Liz Atkinson.

The by-election was called following the resignation of Cllr. Sam J. Townend.

2010–2014

The by-election was called following the resignation of Cllr. Toren Smith.

The by-election was called following the resignation of Cllr. Steve Reed.

 

The by-election was called following the death of Cllr. Ms. Ruth Ling.

The by-election was called following the resignation of Cllr. Kingsley J. Abrams.

2014–2018

 

The by-election was called following the disqualification of Cllr. Sonia Winifred.

 

 

The by-election was called following the resignation of Cllr. Chris Marsh.

 

The by-election was called following the death of Cllr. Niranjan Francis.

By-elections 2018-2022

 

The by-election was caused by the death of Cllr Matt Parr

 

The by-election was caused by the resignation of Cllr Jane Edbrooke

 

The by-election was caused by the resignation of Cllr Lib Peck

Lambeth's recent political history

In 1979, the administration of Edward "Red Ted" Knight organised the borough's first public demonstration against the Thatcher government.

In 1985, the left-wing Labour administration of Knight was subjected to 'rate-capping', with its budget restricted by the Government. Knight and most of the Labour councillors protested by refusing to set any budget. This protest resulted in 32 councillors being ordered to repay to the council the interest the council had lost as a result of budgeting delays, and also being disqualified from office.

In 1991, Joan Twelves's administration both failed to collect the poll tax and openly opposed the war in the Persian Gulf. Twelves, and 12 other councillors were subsequently suspended from the labour party's local group by regional officials for advocating non-payment of the poll tax and other radical policies in 1992.

Twelves's equally militant deputy leader in this era was John Harrison.

References

External links
Lambeth Council
Electionmemory.com – manifestos, candidates and voters opinions on the 2006 Lambeth local elections